Ralph Charles Wilson (June 24, 1880 – February 14, 1930) was an American gymnast who competed in the 1904 Summer Olympics. In 1904 he won the bronze medal in the club swinging event.

References

External links
 

1880 births
1930 deaths
Gymnasts at the 1904 Summer Olympics
Olympic bronze medalists for the United States in gymnastics
American male artistic gymnasts
Medalists at the 1904 Summer Olympics